Micrococcus luteus is a Gram-positive to Gram-variable, nonmotile, tetrad-arranging, pigmented, saprotrophic coccus bacterium in the family Micrococcaceae. It is urease and catalase positive. An obligate aerobe, M. luteus is found in soil, dust, water and air, and as part of the normal microbiota of the mammalian skin. The bacterium also colonizes the human mouth, mucosae, oropharynx and upper respiratory tract. 

Micrococcus luteus is generally harmless but can become an opportunistic pathogen in immunocompromised people or those with indwelling catheters. It resists antibiotic treatment by slowing of major metabolic processes and induction of unique genes. Its genome has a high G + C content.

Micrococcus luteus is coagulase negative, bacitracin susceptible, and forms bright yellow colonies on nutrient agar. 

Micrococcus luteus has been shown to survive in oligotrophic environments for extended periods of time. It has survived for at least 34,000 to 170,000 years, as assessed by 16S rRNA analysis, and possibly much longer.  Its genome was sequenced in 2010 and is one of the smallest genomes of free-living Actinomycetota sequenced to date, comprising a single circular chromosome of 2,501,097 bp.

Novel codon usage
Micrococcus luteus was one of the early examples of novel codon usage, which led to the conclusion that the genetic code is not static, but evolves.

Classification
Micrococcus luteus was formerly known as Micrococcus lysodeikticus.

In 2003, it was proposed that one strain of Micrococcus luteus, ATCC 9341, be reclassified as Kocuria rhizophila.

Ultraviolet absorption
Norwegian researchers in 2013 found a M. luteus strain that synthesizes a pigment that absorbs wavelengths of light from 350 to 475 nanometers. Exposure to these wavelengths of ultraviolet light has been correlated with an increased incidence of skin cancer, and scientists believe this pigment can be used to make a sunscreen that can protect against ultraviolet light.

Tests for identification

References

External links

MicrobeWiki
Type strain of Micrococcus luteus at BacDive -  the Bacterial Diversity Metadatabase

Micrococcaceae
Bacteria described in 1872